Pistulya is an Indian Marathi-language short film written and directed by Nagraj Manjule. Produced by Aatpat Production and New Arts DCS. Pistulya won the National Film Award for Best Debut Director and Non-Feature Film Direction Best Debut Director and Best Child Actor Awards in Non-feature Film category at the 58th National Film Awards.

Plot 
The film is based on the life of an 8-year-old boy from the backward Wadar community, who struggles to educate himself.

Cast 

 Suraj Pawar 
 Vaishali Kendale
 Prashant Kamble
 Vitthal Bulbule
 Sanket Pavase
 Nagraj Manjule

Production 
The film Pistolya was shot in Ahmednagar over a two-day period with a budget of Rs ₹1.5 lakh. Which was Manjule's friend's family contribution. Suraj Pawar was offered the role when the director visited his school in Karmala.

Accolades

National Film awards 

 Best Debut Non-feature Film of a Director - Nagraj Manjule 
 Best Child Actor - Suraj Pawar

Awards 

 Maharashtra Times - Best Short Film Award 
 Aarohi Film festival Mumbai 2009 - Best Short Film and Best Actor Awards
 Nashik International Film Festival 2009 - Best Actor and Golden Camera Award
 Hyderabad Film festival 2010 - Best Short Film Award at  
 20th IDPA Film festival Mumbai 2009 - Certificate of Merit
 Pratibimb Short Film Festival, Ahmednagar 2009 - second best short film

Nominations 

 Children Film Festival Lucknow 2010
 Goa Marathi Film Festival 2011
 Asian Film Festival 2009
 Kolkata International Film Festival 2010
 ICE Short Film Festival Pune 2010
 Mumbai international Film festival 2010
 Tathya Film Festival Hyderabad 2010
 Asiatica Film Mediate Film Festival

References

External links 

 

Indian short films
2009 short films
Indian short documentary films
Indian short stories